King Arwald (died 686 AD) was the last King of the Isle of Wight and last pagan king in Anglo-Saxon England. Saint Arwald is the name collectively given to King Arwald's sons or brothers who, being baptised before their execution, were later canonised and are considered in some Christian traditions to be martyr saints.

King Arwald
Nearly all that is known of him is from Bede's Historia ecclesiastica gentis Anglorum, which describes the invasion of the Isle of Wight by Cædwalla, King of Wessex. A Jutish King of the Isle of Wight and the Wihtwara tribe, he claimed descent from the legendary founders of the island, Stuf and Whitgar. He was killed in battle during the invasion.

Saint Arwald
Though King Arwald was killed in battle, his two sons (or in some versions his brothers) escaped to the Great Ytene Forest (now called the New Forest). They were betrayed to Cædwalla, and in some versions were then taken to a place where he "was in hiding with his wounds" at Stoneham, near Southampton. Shortly before they were put to the sword they allegedly converted to Christianity by the intervention of Abbot Cynibert of Hreutford, being described by Bede as "the first fruits" of the massacre because of this conversion. Cædwalla later died of wounds sustained during his invasion.

Though venerated as saints, their names are unknown, but they are called collectively "St. Arwald" after their father (or brother). Their feast day is 22 April.

Folklore

A version of the story of Arwald survives in the folklore of the nearby New Forest, a neighbouring area with similarly Jutish heritage to the Isle of Wight. In this tradition the two brothers escape to the Ytene, where they encounter various mysterious figures (which have been theorised by some as representing gods of Anglo-Saxon paganism), before finally being betrayed by a wealthy Ealdorman. They are then forced to convert to Christianity, before being killed in the forest by Cædwalla, but the elder brother is able to impale himself on a tree before being murdered, dedicating his death to Woden and thus redeeming himself to the old gods. The ghost of the younger brother is said to walk the forest still, and on April 22nd has been seen with the ghosts of his brother, King Arwald and Woden himself, feasting on the site of their deaths.

Legacy

Arwald's unnamed sister survived, as the wife of the king of Kent, who went on to become a direct ancestor of Alfred the Great. 

Caedwalla by  Frank Cowper (1888) portrays King Arwald as the pagan antagonist to the Christian Caedwalla. 

The Quay Arts Centre in Newport exhibited an Isle of Wight Hidden Heroes exhibition which included a sculpture of a mask of Arwald by Nigel George. This is now on permanent display at Newport Roman Villa, and local celebrations of Arwald recur on the Isle of Wight annually on his heirs' Saints Day.

Arwald's Kingdom; Tales from the Isle of Wight (2018) by Mark Francis is a book of poetry, stories and hiking around the Isle of Wight.

Notes

References

Sources
Bede, History of the English Church and People 4, 16
Eddius Stephanus, Vita Wilfridi
Kings of the Isle of Wight

External links
 

686 deaths
Jutish people
Year of birth unknown
Germanic warriors
New Forest folklore
People from the Isle of Wight
Anglo-Saxon pagans
7th-century English monarchs
Anglo-Saxons killed in battle
Monarchs killed in action
History of the Isle of Wight